The song parrot or singing parrot (Geoffroyus heteroclitus) is a species of parrot in the family Psittaculidae.

Overview
Song parrot is found in the Bismarck Archipelago and on Bougainville Island in Papua New Guinea, and in the Solomon Islands except Rennel. Its natural habitat is subtropical or tropical moist lowland forests. This species demonstrates a large to small landmass inter-island colonization pattern based on its presence in Molehanua village, Ugi Island.

References

song parrot
song parrot
Birds of the Bismarck Archipelago
Birds of the Solomon Islands
song parrot
song parrot
song parrot
Taxonomy articles created by Polbot